Egberdiena "Diny" Hobers (born 10 December 1932) is a retired Dutch high jumper. She competed at the 1960 Summer Olympics and finished in 16th place.

References

External links
Meerkamp Vrouwen. Periode 1945–1972. atletiekhistorici.nl

1932 births
Living people
Athletes (track and field) at the 1960 Summer Olympics
Dutch female high jumpers
Olympic athletes of the Netherlands
Sportspeople from Emmen, Netherlands